Craig Brown may refer to:

 Craig Brown (footballer, born 1893) (1893–1963), Scottish footballer
 Craig Brown (footballer, born 1940), Scottish footballer and manager
 Craig Brown (mayor) (–2020), New Zealand local-body politician
 Craig Brown (cricketer) (born 1954), Australian cricketer
 Craig Brown (satirist) (born 1957), British critic and satirist
 Craig Brown (canoeist) (born 1971), British slalom canoer
 Craig Brown (footballer, born 1971), Scottish footballer
 Craig Brown (curler) (born 1975), American curler
 Craig Brown (taekwondo) (born 1983), English-Jamaican taekwondo practitioner